Faith Van Duin (born 6 June 1986) is a New Zealand mixed martial artist currently competing in the Featherweight division. She most notably fought in Invicta Fighting Championships.

Mixed martial arts career

Early career
Van Duin made her professional mixed martial arts debut in April 2013. She fought primarily in her native New Zealand and Australia, amassing a record of 4–1 before joining Invicta Fighting Championships.

Invicta Fighting Championships
Van Duin was expected to make her promotional debut on 5 December 2014 at Invicta FC 10: Waterson vs. Tiburcio against Charmaine Tweet. However, the bout was scrapped on 3 December after Tweet was medically disqualified from competing on the card.

Van Duin eventually made her debut for the promotion on 24 April 2015 at Invicta FC 12: Kankaanpää vs. Souza when she faced Amanda Bell. Van Duin won the fight via submission due to a rear-naked choke in the second round. The win also earned Van Duin her first Performance of the Night bonus award.

Van Duin faced Cris Cyborg for the Invicta FC Featherweight Championship on 9 July 2015 at Invicta FC 13: Cyborg vs. Van Duin.

Kickboxing and Muay Thai Career
On the 5th of November, Van Duin fought former World Boxing Champion Geovana Peres for the WMC New Zealand Heavyweight title. Van Duin lost by Split Decision.

Mixed martial arts record

|-
|Loss
|align=center|6–4
|Kaitlin Young
|TKO (punches)
|Invicta FC 35: Bennett vs. Rodriguez II
|
|align=center|3
|align=center|3:52
|Kansas City, Kansas, United States
|
|-
|Loss
|align=center|6–3
|Irene Aldana
|TKO (punches)
|Invicta FC 19: Maia vs. Modafferi
|
|align=center|1
|align=center|4:57
|Kansas City, Missouri, United States
|
|-
|Win
|align=center|6–2
|Charlene Watt
|Decision (unanimous)
|Brace 41
|
|align=center|3
|align=center|N/A
| Christchurch, New Zealand
|
|-
|Loss
|align=center|5–2
|Cris Cyborg
|TKO (knee to the body and punches)
|Invicta FC 13: Cyborg vs. Van Duin
|
|align=center|1
|align=center|0:45
| Las Vegas, Nevada, United States
|
|-
|Win
|align="center" |5–1
|Amanda Bell
|Submission (rear-naked choke)
|Invicta FC 12: Kankaanpää vs. Souza
|
|align="center" | 2
|align="center" | 0:38
|Kansas City, Missouri, United States
|
|-
|Loss
|align="center" |4–1
|Arlene Blencowe
|TKO (knee to the body)
|Storm MMA - Storm Damage 5
|
|align="center" | 3
|align="center" | 3:00
|Canberra, Australia
| Catchweight fight. Blencowe did not make weight.
|-
|Win
|align="center" |4–0
|Kate Da Silva
|Submission (triangle choke)
|Storm MMA - Storm Damage 3
|
|align="center" | 4
|align="center" | 1:36
|Canberra, Australia
| Storm MMA Finals. Won Storm MMA Woman's Featherweight Championship.
|-
|Win
|align="center" |3–0
|Arlene Blencowe
|Decision (split)
|Storm MMA - Storm Damage 3
|
|align="center" | 2
|align="center" | 3:00
|Canberra, Australia
| Storm MMA Semi-Finals
|-
|Win
|align="center" |2–0
|Michelle Peruzzi
|TKO (punches)
|Storm MMA - Storm Damage 3
|
|align="center" | 1
|align="center" | 2:01
|Canberra, Australia
| Storm MMA Quarter-Finals
|-
|Win
|align="center" |1–0
|Kelly Kinita
|Submission (rear-naked choke)
|ETK - Sunday Session 18
|
|align="center" | 4
|align="center" | N/A
|Auckland, New Zealand
|
|-

See also
List of female mixed martial artists

References

External links
 Official website (archived)
 Faith Van Duin Awakening Profile
 
 Faith Van Duin at Invicta FC

1986 births
Living people
New Zealand female mixed martial artists
Featherweight mixed martial artists
Sportspeople from Tauranga
New Zealand Māori sportspeople